Marudhar Kesari Jain College for Women, is a women's general degree college located in Vaniyambadi - Tirupattur Highway in Vellore district, Tamil Nadu. It was established in the year 1994. The college is affiliated with Thiruvalluvar University. This college offers different courses in arts, commerce and science.

Departments

Science
Physics
Chemistry
Mathematics
Biochemistry
Biotechnology
Nutrition and Dietics
Computer Science

Arts and Commerce
Tamil
English
Urdu
History
Economics
Interior Design and Fashion
Business Administration
Commerce

Accreditation
The college is  recognized by the University Grants Commission (UGC).

References

External links

Educational institutions established in 1994
1994 establishments in Tamil Nadu
Colleges affiliated to Thiruvalluvar University
Academic institutions formerly affiliated with the University of Madras